Moulines is the name or part of the name of several communes in France:

Moulines, Calvados in the Calvados department
Moulines, Manche in the Manche department